CMS Grammar School may refer to:
 CMS Grammar School, Lagos
 CMS Grammar School, Freetown, now the Sierra Leone Grammar School